Wang Jiao (born 20 January 1988, Shenyang, Liaoning) is a female Chinese freestyle wrestler who won gold at the 2008 Summer Olympics.

She competed at the 2008 Summer Olympics.  She was a late replacement for Xu Wang.  She beat Jenny Fransson in the first round, Ali Bernard in the quarter-finals and Kyoko Hamaguchi in the semi-finals before beating Stanka Zlateva in the gold medal match.

She competed again at the 2012 Summer Olympics, but was less successful.  She beat Amarachi Obiajunwa in her first match and Svetlana Saenco in the quarterfinals before losing to Nataliya Vorobyova in the semifinals.  Because Vorobyova reached the final, Wang entered the repechage, but lost her bronze medal match to Guzel Manyurova.

See also
 China at the 2012 Summer Olympics

References

External links
 profile

1988 births
Living people
Olympic gold medalists for China
Olympic wrestlers of China
Sportspeople from Shenyang
Wrestlers at the 2008 Summer Olympics
Wrestlers at the 2012 Summer Olympics
Olympic medalists in wrestling
Chinese female sport wrestlers
Medalists at the 2008 Summer Olympics
21st-century Chinese women